Royal Bavarian Jagdstaffel 76, commonly abbreviated to Jasta 76, was a "hunting group" (i.e., fighter squadron) of the Luftstreitkräfte, the air arm of the Imperial German Army during World War I. The squadron would score over 20 aerial victories during the war. The unit's victories came at the expense of six killed in action, four wounded in action, and three taken prisoner of war.

History
Jasta 76 was founded at the Bavarian Fliegerersatz-Abteilung ("Replacement Detachment") 1 at Schleißheim on 7 September 1917. It was not actually staffed and mobilized until 15 October 1917. On 4 November 1917, it was posted to Armee-Abteilung B, equipped with Albatros D.V fighters. The new squadron scored its first victory on 1 December 1917.

On 18 March 1918, Jasta 76 moved to 2 Armee. It is unknown whether its final move to Habsheim returned it to Armee-Abteilung B.

Commanding officers (Staffelführer)
 Walter Böning: 15 October 1917 – 31 May 1918
 Ludwig Schmid: 31 May 1918 – 16 July 1918
 Amandus Rostock: circa 16 July 1918

Duty stations
 Habsheim, France: 4 November 1917
 Liéramont, France: 18 March 1918
 Suzanne, France: 15 April 1918
 Bignicourt, France: 10 July 1918
 Habsheim, France: 19 August 1918

References

Bibliography
 

76
Military units and formations of Bavaria
Military units and formations established in 1917
1917 establishments in Germany
Military units and formations disestablished in 1918
1918 disestablishments in Germany